Egbert Rolf "Erben" Wennemars (born 1 November 1975) is a Dutch former speed skater. He specialized in the sprint and middle distances of 500, 1000 and 1500 meters, and set six world records during his career.

Speed skating career

Wennemars was the first skater who skated the 1500 m faster than 1:50.00. His 1:49.89 in the summer of 1997, however, was not regarded as an official world record.

During the 1998 Winter Olympics in Nagano, Japan, where Wennemars was qualified for the 500, 1000 and 1500 m, he dislocated his shoulder when Grunde Njøs from Norway fell and collided with Wennemars during the second 500 m race. Wennemars was not able to participate in the other distances after that.

Wennemars achieved his first big success in 2003 during the World Single Distance Championships in Berlin, Germany,  by winning the gold medal at the 1000 m and 1500 m. One year later he became world champion in sprint in Nagano. In 2005 he defended his world sprint title successfully in Salt Lake City, United States.

Wennemars qualified for the 500 m, 1000 m, 1500 m and the team pursuit events at the 2006 Winter Olympics in Turin, Italy. His teammates for the team pursuit were Sven Kramer, Carl Verheijen, Mark Tuitert and Rintje Ritsma.

In 2003, Wennemars was chosen as athlete of the year in the Netherlands, and in 2003, 2004 and 2005 as Dutch skater of the year. After failing to qualify for the 2010 Winter Olympics, he announced his farewell from competitive skating. On 11 January 2010, Wennemars officially retired as a speed-skating professional.

Records

Personal records

World records

Tournament overview

source: 
DNS = Did not start
DNF = Did not finish
DQ = Disqualified
NC = No classification

World Cup

Source:
(b) = Division B
DNF = Did not finish
DQ = Disqualified
* = 100m (first 100 meters of the World Cup 500 meter)– = Did not participate''

Medals won

Total number of medals: 198

Personal life
Wennemars is married to TV-presenter Renate van der Zalm, with whom he has two sons: Joep and Niels.

References

External links 
 
 
 
 
 
 

1975 births
Dutch male speed skaters
Speed skaters at the 1998 Winter Olympics
Speed skaters at the 2002 Winter Olympics
Speed skaters at the 2006 Winter Olympics
Olympic speed skaters of the Netherlands
Medalists at the 2006 Winter Olympics
Olympic medalists in speed skating
Olympic bronze medalists for the Netherlands
World record setters in speed skating
People from Dalfsen
Living people
Sportspeople from Overijssel